Bulbuli Panja is an Indian actress who works in Bengali cinema and television . She has acted in movies like Bapi Bari Jaa (2012), Cockpit and Bolo Dugga Mai Ki. She has appeared in Star Jalsha and Zee Bangla serials like Andarmahal and Phagun Bou. In 2020, she replaced actress Monalisa Paul to play lead antagonist 'Tandra' in the serial Ke Apon Ke Por.

Personal life
Panja is married. She has one son. Footballer Kalyan Chaubey is her older brother.

Filmography

Television

See also 
 Laboni Sarkar
 Churni Ganguly

References

Living people
Actresses from Kolkata
Indian film actresses
Indian television actresses
Indian soap opera actresses
Actresses in Bengali cinema
Actresses in Bengali television
Bengali television actresses
Year of birth missing (living people)
21st-century Indian actresses